Tin Drum is the fifth and final studio album by English band Japan, released in November 1981 by record label Virgin. It peaked at No. 12 on the UK charts, and featured the top 5 single "Ghosts". It has received acclaim as the band's best and most original work.

Content 
Tin Drum continued the band's now-established mix of electronic elements with traditional instrumentation, but leans far more towards Far Eastern influences than any of their previous albums. Lead guitarist Rob Dean had departed in May 1981 and vocalist/songwriter/second guitarist David Sylvian had taken on his duties, which had been very greatly reduced by the band's change of musical direction. Brooklyn Rail writer Paul Grimstad described the album's sound as "mannered cubist pop".

Musically, Tin Drum was a meticulously crafted blend of complex rhythms, keyboard textures, and Mick Karn's bass playing. Keyboardist Richard Barbieri recalled that recording the album "was a very laborious process, but creatively satisfying... it was the first album where we actually produced something... completely original." Also important for the band finding their own unique sound was their work with Steve Nye, who had replaced John Punter as the band's producer. However, in a 1982 interview, Sylvian commented that by the making of Tin Drum, Karn had become more preoccupied with his own projects and was not involved as much as he was on previous albums, essentially becoming little more than a "session musician". 

Barbieri remembers this album as 'quite an adventure in synth programming'. Synthesizers used included the Sequential Circuits Prophet-5, an Oberheim OB-X, and a Roland System 700.

Lyrically, the songs include notions of romance, melancholia, travel and escape, and particularly David Sylvian's fascination for Eastern culture, which at times ("Visions of China", "Cantonese Boy") have a satirical undercurrent. "Ghosts" was Sylvian's most personal lyric to date, expressing notions of self-doubt, ambiguity, regret, and hope.

Release 
Tin Drum was released on 13 November 1981 by record label Virgin.

Four of the album's eight songs were released as singles in the UK—"The Art of Parties", "Visions of China", "Ghosts", and "Cantonese Boy"—whilst a live version of "Canton" was issued as a single to promote the Oil on Canvas live album in 1983. "The Art of Parties" was released as a single in May 1981, and along with its B-side "Life Without Buildings", had been recorded at Basing Street Studios. However, it was re-recorded for the album. When the band began recording the album in June 1981 at The Manor Studio, the first tracks to be completed were "Talking Drum", which was initially intended to be the next single, and "Canton" (intended as the B-side), but this release did not occur. Of all the singles, the most commercially successful was "Ghosts", a minimalist, drum-free song which reached No. 5 in the UK, surprisingly becoming Japan's biggest hit. "Visions of China" reached No. 32 and "Cantonese Boy" reached No. 24. The album itself peaked at No. 12 in the UK, and was certified gold by the British Phonographic Industry in 1982.

In 2000 Sylvian re-recorded "Ghosts", using the original Japan backing track, and this version was included on his compilation albums Everything and Nothing (2000) and A Victim of Stars 1982–2012 (2012).

Tin Drum was reissued on CD in 2003 as a deluxe box set containing a six-panel digipak housing the remastered original CD with original cover art, a gatefold sleeved "The Art of Parties" CD, and a 24-page booklet with pictures of the band. A budget single-CD version was later released.

On 24 August 2018, two new half speed-mastered vinyl pressings were released: a single 33 rpm version and a deluxe double 45 rpm version. Both were mastered by Miles Showell at Abbey Road Studios. For the first time, all lyrics were printed inside the gatefold sleeve of the deluxe album.

Reception 

With Tin Drum, Japan received some of the best reviews of their career in the contemporary British music press. NMEs Paul Morley wrote of the album: "Gorgeously erotic, perfectly evanescent. It accepts transitoriness, yet delights in sensation." Morley also praised the album as a "triumph" for David Sylvian in particular, "the sensitive individual, the deep feeling loner, his voice stricken on the tensions between confidence and gloom, whose lyrics are a questing expression of love and loss, doubt and despondency. His old clumsiness at describing his position, at probing his passion has been replaced with a sublime simplicity." In Smash Hits, critic David Bostock proclaimed that "Japan have made their best album yet." Record Mirror writer Suzie said that while she still found Sylvian's vocals "mannered and... far too close to Bryan Ferry for comfort", Tin Drum is "a very accomplished musical exercise."

However, Melody Makers Lynne Barber was less impressed: "The music slots together in jigsaw fashion, leaving plenty of space and clean air... but there seems to be little purpose to their constructs, a dearth of aesthetic sensibility. Japan's music is pre-fabricated, built from an architect's well-laid plan, yet not sculpted with an artist's passion or insight."

Joseph Burnett of The Quietus described Tin Drum in 2013 as "unique in pop history, a fearlessly ambitious, unusual and conceptual work of art that defies genre categorisation." In a retrospective review, AllMusic critic Ned Raggett called it Japan's "most unique, challenging, and striking album". Trouser Press wrote that Tin Drum "presents Japan at peak form".

Roland Orzabal of the band Tears for Fears called Tin Drum "an absolute conceptual masterpiece from lyrics to artwork... just everything", and has stated that it was a primary influence on Tears for Fears' first album The Hurting.

Track listing 

Note: The bonus tracks were included only on the limited edition two-disc version of the album. The single-disc version features no bonus tracks.

Personnel

Japan 
David Sylvian – vocals, guitar, keyboard, keyboard programming, tapes, cover concept
Mick Karn – fretless bass guitar, African flute, dida
Steve Jansen – acoustic drums, electronic drums, keyboard percussion, Linn LM-1 programming ("Still Life In Mobile Homes" and "Cantonese Boy")
Richard Barbieri – keyboard, keyboard programming, tapes

Additional personnel 
Yuka Fujii – backing vocals
Simon House – violin
Steve Joule – design
Steve Nye – engineering
Phil Bodger – assistant engineer
Fin Costello – photography

Charts

Certifications

References

External links 
 

Japan (band) albums
1981 albums
Albums produced by Steve Nye
Virgin Records albums
Avant-pop albums